Haykota Subregion is a subregion in the western Gash-Barka region (Zoba Gash-Barka) of Eritrea. Its capital lies at Haykota.

Towns and villages
Antalla
Bitama
Elit
Haykota

References

Subregions of Eritrea

Gash-Barka Region
Subregions of Eritrea